Lisewo Kaszubskie is a non-operational PKP railway station on the disused PKP rail line 230 in Lisewo Kaszubskie (Pomeranian Voivodeship), Poland.

Lines crossing the station

References 
Lisewo Kaszubskie article at Polish Stations Database, URL accessed at 19 March 2006

Railway stations in Pomeranian Voivodeship
Disused railway stations in Pomeranian Voivodeship
Wejherowo County